A Babelutte is a sort of long toffee flavoured with honey or vergeoise (demerara sugar) from Veurne, in  Westhoek (West Flanders, Belgium). The candy is closely related to Butterscotch.

Etymology 
The name is likely to come from the Flemish "babbelen", speaking a lot, and "uit", finished because when you eat the toffee, you cannot speak anymore (either because you are enjoying it or because you cannot open the mouth). An opposing but similar explanation attributes the origin of the word to "babbelle" (which means "chatty" in Ch'ti).

History
The candy originates from the 19th century, from a couple that prepared and sold it to tourists on Belgian coastal beaches.

Babelutte de Lille 
The Babelutte de Lille is a famous babelutte in the Nord-Pas-de-Calais.

Brands and companies
Moeder Babelutte is a small chain of shops in western Flanders that purveys babelutte, along with other sweets.

References

Belgian confectionery
French confectionery